Luis Germán del Carmen Carty Monserrate (Born July 16, 1968 in Cañete) is a former Peruvian professional football (soccer) player.

Club career
Carty most prominently played for Cienciano. He was the top goalscorer as Cienciano won the 2003 Copa Sudamericana. During his career, he played for, among others, Coronel Bolognesi, Yurimaguas, Sport Boys, Universitario, Sporting Cristal and Alianza Lima in Peru, Mexican clubs Atlante F.C. and CD Irapuato, Salvadoran club C.D. Chalatenango, as well as Club Blooming in Bolivia. He is nowadays the oldest active player in the Peruvian championship.

International career
Carty has made 25 appearances for the Peru national football team.

Individual Honours
Top scorer in 2003 Copa Sudamericana – 6 goals

International Goals

References

External links

1968 births
Living people
People from Lima Region
Association football forwards
Peruvian footballers
Peru international footballers
1993 Copa América players
Peruvian expatriate footballers
Peruvian Primera División players
Peruvian Segunda División players
Liga MX players
Sport Boys footballers
Club Universitario de Deportes footballers
Atlante F.C. footballers
Irapuato F.C. footballers
Sporting Cristal footballers
Club Blooming players
Estudiantes de Medicina footballers
Cienciano footballers
Club Alianza Lima footballers
C.D. Chalatenango footballers
Unión Huaral footballers
Sport Áncash footballers
Total Chalaco footballers
Coronel Bolognesi footballers
Atlético Minero footballers
Expatriate footballers in Bolivia
Expatriate footballers in Mexico
Expatriate footballers in El Salvador
Peruvian expatriate sportspeople in Bolivia
Deportivo Garcilaso managers